Raúl Navarro del Río (born 7 February 1994) is a Spanish footballer who plays for Burgos CF. Mainly a right back, he can also play as a midfielder.

Club career
Navarro was born in Seville, Andalusia, represented Colegio Salesianos de Triana, CD Utrera and Sevilla FC as a youth. He made his senior debut with the C-team on 17 March 2013, coming on as a second-half substitute in a 0–0 Tercera División away draw against CMD San Juan.

Navarro subsequently established himself as a regular starter for the C-side, and also appeared rarely with the reserves during the 2015–16 season, as the club achieved promotion in Segunda División B. On 17 July 2016, he signed for another reserve team, UD Almería B in the fourth tier.

On 12 July 2017, Navarro agreed to a deal with Real Valladolid, being assigned to B-team in the third level. He moved to fellow league team Burgos CF on 7 August 2020, and helped in their promotion to Segunda División after a 19-year absence in 2021.

Navarro made his professional debut on 15 August 2021, starting in a 0–1 away draw against Sporting de Gijón.

References

External links

1994 births
Living people
Footballers from Seville
Spanish footballers
Association football defenders
Association football midfielders
Segunda División players
Segunda División B players
Tercera División players
Sevilla FC C players
Sevilla Atlético players
UD Almería B players
Real Valladolid Promesas players
Burgos CF footballers